Bagauda  is a village development committee in Chitwan District in Bagmati Province of southern Nepal. At the time of the 2011 Nepal census it had a population of 10,913 people (4,856 male; 6,057 female) living in 2,532 individual households.

References

Populated places in Chitwan District